Curling at the 2015 Winter Universiade was held from February 5 to 13 at the Pabellón de Universiada in Granada, Spain.

Medal summary

Medal table

Medalists

Men

Teams

Round-robin standings
Final round-robin standings

Round-robin results

Draw 1
Thursday, February 5, 14:00

Draw 2
Friday, February 6, 9:00

Draw 3
Friday, February 6, 19:00

Draw 4
Saturday, February 7, 14:00

Draw 5
Sunday, February 8, 9:00

Draw 6
Sunday, February 8, 19:00

Draw 7
Monday, February 9, 14:00

Draw 8
Tuesday, February 10, 9:00

Draw 9
Tuesday, February 10, 19:00

Placement game
Wednesday, February 11, 9:00

Switzerland is eliminated from the curling tournament at the 2017 Winter Universiade.

Playoffs

Semifinals
Thursday, February 12, 9:00

Bronze Medal Game
Thursday, February 12, 16:00

Gold Medal Game
Friday, February 13, 16:00

Women

Teams

Round-robin standings
Final round-robin standings

Round-robin results

Draw 1
Thursday, February 5, 9:00

Draw 2
Thursday, February 5, 19:00

Draw 3
Friday, February 6, 14:00

Draw 4
Saturday, February 7, 9:00

Draw 5
Saturday, February 7, 19:00

Draw 6
Sunday, February 8, 14:00

Draw 7
Monday, February 9, 9:00

Draw 8
Monday, February 9, 19:00

Draw 9
Tuesday, February 10, 14:00

Tiebreaker
Wednesday, February 11, 9:00

Playoffs

Semifinals
Thursday, February 12, 9:00

Bronze Medal Game
Thursday, February 12, 16:00

Gold Medal Game
Friday, February 13, 9:00

References

External links

Website at the World Curling Federation
Results book

Curling
Universiade
Winter Universiade
2015